The Mosque of Omar Ibn Al-Khattab (Spanish transcription Omar Iban Al-Jattab) is a mosque in Maicao, La Guajira, Colombia. It is the third largest mosque in Latin America. It is locally known as "La Mezquita" ("The Mosque"), simply because it is the only mosque in the region. Along with the Dar Alarkan School, they are the centers for the Islamic faith and culture in the region. The mosque was constructed on 17 September 1997, and named after the second caliph Omar Ibn Al-Khattab. It was designed by the Iranian architect Ali Namazi, built by the civil engineer Oswaldo Vizcaino Fontalvo, using Italian marble for its construction. It can easily accommodate over 1,000 people.

Interior
At the entrance there is a large open hall decorated with framed Arabic calligraphy. Further on, there is another hall, larger than the first, used by men for prayer. This is also where they meet in order to end periods of fasting. The ceiling of this room has decorative engravings. Facing Mecca there is a place for the women to pray, elevated and overlooking the men's hall. The minaret dominates the upper parts of the structure.

Below the great stairs exiting the mosque there is a room for undertaking of the deceased before their remains are taken to the local Muslim cemetery.

See also
  List of mosques in the Americas
  Lists of mosques 
 Islam in Colombia

References

External links

 La mezquita de Maicao (Colombia) cumple diez años, 16 September 2007
 Cumple Diez Años de Fundada la Mezquite de Maicao, Corazón de los Musulmanes Guajiros, 19 Sep. 2007
 Foto Panoramio

1997 establishments in Colombia
Mosques completed in 1997
Mosques in Colombia
Buildings and structures in La Guajira Department